Mini is a six-song EP by The Wedding Present. It was released in 1996 by Cooking Vinyl. All of the songs are about automobiles.

Critical reception
The Washington Post praised the American version, Mini Plus, writing that the songs "typically combine terse, jumpy guitars with explosive drums and modest but effective hooks." The Chicago Reader wrote: "Over frenzied rhythms and smart guitar play, David Gedge croons an impressive array of hooks with enough eccentricity to make Morrissey sound like a shy mumbler."

Track listing 
All tracks written by Belk/Gedge/Smith.

 Drive – 2:29
 Love Machine – 3:52
 Go, Man, Go – 2:23
 Mercury – 4:20
 Convertible – 2:14
 Sports Car – 4:03

People involved 
 David Gedge - vocals, guitars, keyboards
 Darren Belk - guitars, bass
 Simon Smith - drums, percussion
 Jayne Lockey - extra vocals

Mini Plus

The EP was issued as Mini Plus in America, with three extra tracks.

 Sucker – 1:43
 Waiting on the Guns – 3:20
 Jet Girl – 2:25

"Sucker" written by Belk/Gedge/Smith. "Waiting on the Guns" written by Butterglory. "Jet Girl" written by Belk/Dorrington/Gedge/Smith.

References

External links
 Theweddingpresent* - Mini Plus
 TWP Albums & Films | scopitones.co.uk

The Wedding Present albums